Gordon Rayner (June 14, 1935 – September 26, 2010) was a Canadian abstract expressionist painter. His way of creating art was idiosyncratic and characterized by constant innovation and often by transformation of his medium. Later, he integrated realism into his practice.

Biography 
As a young person, Gordon Rayner learned to paint from his father, a commercial artist and weekend painter, and from his father`s close friend, Jack Bush. He spent 17 years working in commercial art, starting with Bush's commercial art firm, Wookey, Bush and Winter. An exhibition of Painters Eleven in 1955, and especially the work of William Ronald, which he visited with his friend, artist Dennis Burton, at Toronto's Hart House Gallery (today the Justina M. Barnicke Gallery, Art Museum at the University of Toronto) turned him towards abstraction.

Under the influence of the neo-Dada movement current in Toronto in the late 1950s and first half of the 1960s, Rayner began to combine found materials with his paintings.

In 1966, he began a new period in his work centred around images of Magnetawan, an area 200 miles north of Toronto, north of the Muskoka District. It provided him with a favourite painting place in which he could experiment with materials and technique while demonstrating how to refer to nature without copying it in his work. To express his feelings, he used oblique references, a thick and expressionist technique, and sometimes found objects. These paintings were intuitive reinterpretations of landscapes dramatically conceived.

Rayner showed his work with Toronto's Isaacs Gallery. For this reason, he has been called part of the Isaacs Group of artists, which include, among others, Michael Snow, Joyce Wieland, John Meredith and Graham Coughtry.

Rayner had numerous public commissions, among them mural Tempo (porcelain enamel on steel) for the Toronto Transit Commission, Spadina Subway line, St. Clair Station (1977).

In the 1980s, his work shifted direction to a new interest in the figure. He began to reinvent this crucial subject of art for himself using dimensions of the inner, more spiritual self and obliquely explored realism in the context of the body, painting himself in inventive scenes. Some of these paintings are called the Oaxaca Suite, since Rayner lived in Oaxaca in southern Mexico in 1993 and 1994.
 
On September 26, 2010, Gordon Rayner died suddenly at home in Toronto.

Collections 
Agnes Etherington Art Centre, Kingston
Art Gallery of Ontario, Toronto
Art Gallery of Windsor
The Canada Council Art Bank Collection
The Hirshhorn Museum, Washington
MacKenzie Art Gallery, Regina
Montreal Museum of Fine Arts
Museum of Modern Art, New York
National Gallery of Canada, Ottawa
Philadelphia Museum of Art
The Robert McLaughlin Gallery, Oshawa
Vancouver Art Gallery

References

Bibliography 

1935 births
2010 deaths
Artists from Toronto
20th-century Canadian painters
20th-century Canadian sculptors
Canadian male sculptors
20th-century Canadian male artists
20th-century Canadian artists
Canadian abstract artists
Canadian collage artists